C. H. Loknath (14 August 1927 – 31 December 2018) was an Indian actor with more than 1000 Kannada plays and 650 films to his credit. Loknath is affectionately known as "Uncle Loknath" or "Uppinakayi"  in the industry. His last performance was in a Star Suvarna Channel's TV series titled Priyadarshini.

Biography 
Some of the characters he has played are Galileo in Galileo, Rajaram in Aspota, Dr. Faustus in Dr. Faustus, Kakaji in Tanavu Ninnade Manavu Ninnade, and Dushtabudhi in Chandrahasa. His most famous films include Bhootayyana Maga Ayyu, Collegu Ranga, Naagarahaavu, Katha Sangama, Hosa Neeru, Singapurinalli Raja Kulla, Minchina Ota and Mane Mane Kathe. He has also acted in several episodes of Malgudi Days.

C. H. Loknath died after a brief illness on 31 December 2018, aged 91.

Partial filmography

 2016 – ...Re
 2015 - Priyadarshini
 2012 – Bheema Theeradalli
 2012 – A.K. 56
 2009 – Iniya
 2009 – Prem Kahani
 2008 – Anthu Inthu Preethi Banthu
 2008 – Hani Hani
 2007 – Kaada Beladingalu
 2006 – Shubam
 2002 – Dakota Express
 1999 – Premachari
 1997 – Ellaranthalla Nanna Ganda
 1997 – Ammavra Ganda
 1995 – Beladingala Baale
 1995 – Thumbida Mane
 1994 – Chinna
 1992 – Megha Mandara
 1992 – Belliyappa Bangarappa
 1988 – Pushpaka Vimana
 1986 – Hosa Neeru
 1986 – Ee Jeeva Ninagagi
 1985 – Karthavya
 1981 – Edeyuru Siddalingeshwara Mahatme
 1980 – Aruna Raaga
 1980 – Minchina Ota
 1978 – Kakana Kote
 1977 – Kittu Puttu
 1976 – Katha Sangama
 1974 – Bhootayyana Maga Ayyu
 1972 – Nagara Havu
 1972 – Bangaarada Manushya
 1972 – Hrudaya Sangama
 1969 – Gejje Pooje
 1970 – Samskaara

Television series
Malgudi Days

References

External links 
 

1927 births
2018 deaths
Indian male film actors
Kannada male actors
Kannada-language writers
Male actors in Kannada cinema
20th-century Indian male actors
20th-century Indian dramatists and playwrights
21st-century Indian male actors
Recipients of the Rajyotsava Award 2013